núi Cẩn is a mountain of the Xuân Sơn National Park in Phú Thọ Province in northern Vietnam. It is the third highest point in the park at 1144 metres. The Park also contains núi Voi and núi Ten.

References

Mountains of Vietnam
Landforms of Phú Thọ province